A commercial director is a film director who specializes in the creation of commercials, often for television, but sometimes also on film and of  music videos (given that music videos are recognized as a form of advertising for the song featured in the video).

The term is also used for the more general business role of chief commercial officer.

Noted commercial directors
Noted directors of commercials include: Ridley Scott, Adrian Lyne, Hugh Hudson, Jean-Paul Goude, Jonathan Glazer, Michel Gondry, Spike Jonze, Joe Pytka, Tarsem Singh, Dougal Wilson and Tony Kaye, Norman Hafezi, Barry Myers. Music video directors who have gone on to feature film production include Michael Mann and Julien Temple.

See also
:Category:Television commercial directors

References

External links
 tvc-director.com - the tvc director global directory™ resource for commercial film directors (Englisch)

 
 01
 Commercial